Edgewater Hotel or The Edgewater may refer to:

The Edgewater (Madison, Wisconsin), a historic Art Moderne-style hotel
The Edgewater (Seattle, Washington), a hotel
Edgewater Beach Hotel, Edgewater, Chicago, Illinois
Edgewater Gulf Hotel, Biloxi, Mississippi
Edgewater Hotel and Casino, Laughlin, Nevada,